The Scout and Guide movement in Slovakia is served by
Slovenský skauting, member of the World Association of Girl Guides and Girl Scouts and of the World Organization of the Scout Movement
Czech and Slovak Scouts Abroad is a combined Scouts-in-Exile organization, which serves the Slovak community outside of the country
Szlovákiái Magyar Cserkészszövetség, ethnic Hungarian Scouts in Slovakia linked to Magyar Cserkészszövetség
Združenie Katolíckych Vodkýň a Skautov Európy na Slovensku (ZKVSES), contacts with Union Internationale des Guides et Scouts d′Europe

Slovak Scouting in exile

The Czechoslovak government-in-exile officially restored Junák and Czech and Slovak Scout groups were founded in exile, especially in the North of England and the South of Scotland, Rover Crews were founded in the Czechoslovak Armed Units in the United Kingdom and elsewhere.

In 1948 Scouting was banned again in Czechoslovakia. Czech and Slovak refugees founded again Czech and Slovak Scout groups in exile. Junák-in-Exile was formed as a National Scout Organisation-in-Exile for Czechoslovak Scouting. From 1948 to 1950 they were members of the Displaced Persons Scout Division of the Boy Scouts International Bureau.

After the end of Prague Spring in 1968 thousands of refugees left their homeland and many Scouts were among them. So the existing Junák units in many countries were enlarged and new Scout groups were founded in many countries. The Czech and Slovak Scouts-in-Exile in Switzerland founded in cooperation with the Scouts of Switzerland new Junák units. Junák was also active in countries such as Austria, Germany, Luxembourg and the Netherlands.

After the Rebirth of Scouting in Czechoslovakia the Exile movement were disbanded and its members became members of Junák or of the N.S.O.s of their countries of residence.
The Emblem showed on the left is the badge of Czech and Slovak Scouting Abroad, before 1989 this Emblem was in use with the text: Czech and Slovak Scouting Exile.

International Scouting units in Slovakia 

In addition, there are Girl Scouts of the USA Overseas in Bratislava, serviced by way of USAGSO headquarters in New York City

References